SZSE Composite Index is a stock market index of Shenzhen Stock Exchange. It included all companies listed on the exchange.

See also
 SSE Composite Index
 Hang Seng Composite Index

External links
 Official Page

Chinese stock market indices
Shenzhen Stock Exchange